Rhododendron keysii (管花杜鹃) is a rhododendron species native to northeastern India, Bhutan, Sikkim, and southern Tibet, where it grows at altitudes of . The flowers are orange or salmon pink to deep red.

References
 Nuttall, Hooker’s J. Bot. Kew Gard. Misc. 5: 353. 1853.

keysii